AusIndustry is the Australian Government’s specialist business program delivery division in the Department of Industry, Innovation, Science, Research and Tertiary Education. AusIndustry delivers programs for businesses and individuals worth around A$2 billion per year including innovation grants, clean technology, tax incentives, duty concessions, small business development, industry support and venture capital.

History 
The Australian Government announced the creation of AusIndustry on 4 May 1994 as a result of the White Paper Working Nation: White Paper on Employment and Growth 1994.

Services 

AusIndustry delivers business services that build on three key drivers of economic growth - innovation, investment and international competitiveness.
AusIndustry provides incentives to help Australian businesses:
 conduct research and development;
 grow small business;
 take up new technology;
 undertake industry-specific manufacturing and production; and
 commercialise a new technology or venture.

Office locations 

AusIndustry has customer service managers located in more than 20 offices across Australia, including 15 regional offices, plus a national contact centre and website.

References

External links 
 

Government of Australia
Industry in Australia